Charleston (original title: Anche gli angeli tirano di destro) is a 1974 Italian buddy comedy film written and directed by Enzo Barboni. The film is the sequel of Even Angels Eat Beans, with Ricky Bruch (at his film debut) who replaced Bud Spencer as Giuliano Gemma's support.

Cast 
Giuliano Gemma: Sonny Abernati
Ricky Bruch: Rocky
Dominic Barto: Barabas Smith
Enzo Fiermonte: Joe Bendaggio
Edoardo Faieta: Maloney
Laura Becherelli: Virginia
Luigi Bonos: Boarding House Owner
Mario Brega: Barman
Riccardo Pizzuti: Maloney's Henchman

References

External links

1974 films
1970s buddy comedy films
Films set in the 1920s
Films set in the United States
Mafia comedy films
Films scored by Guido & Maurizio De Angelis
Italian buddy comedy films
1970s Italian-language films
1970s American films
1970s Italian films